A by-election was held for the New South Wales Legislative Assembly seat of Liverpool Plains on 26 March 1961 and was triggered by the resignation of Roger Nott, who was the Minister for Agriculture in the Heffron Labor government and accepted an appointment by the Menzies coalition government to be the Administrator of the Northern Territory.

Dates

Result

Roger Nott resigned.

See also
Electoral results for the district of Liverpool Plains
List of New South Wales state by-elections

References

New South Wales state by-elections
1961 elections in Australia
1960s in New South Wales
March 1961 events in Australia